James C. Field (July 21, 1890 - death date unknown) was a professional baseball pitcher in the Negro leagues. He played with the St. Louis Giants in 1921.

References

External links
 and Seamheads

St. Louis Giants players
1890 births
Year of death missing
Baseball pitchers
Baseball players from Kentucky
People from Hopkinsville, Kentucky